"Economic Cooperation and Trade Agreement" is the first trade agreement between India and Australia. Piyush Goyal Union Minister of Commerce and Industry, Consumer Affairs, Food and Public Distribution and Textiles said while addressing a press conference on the ECTA.  Australia has approved the trade pact between these two countries in its Parliament.

Bilateral relations 
India signed the "Economic Cooperation and Trade Agreement" with the earlier Australian Prime Minister Scott Morrison. Indian Prime Minister Narendra Modi and Australian Prime Minister Anthony Albanese along with commerce minister, Piyush Goyal and Don Farrell trade, tourism and investment minister of Australia struck the first trade deal in a decade. Piyush Goyal union minister of commerce and industry shared the news after Prime Minister of Australia, Anthony Albanese  confirmed the passing of the trade agreement by the Australian Parliament.

Impact of the trade pact 

 Australia has agreed to eliminate duties on 100 percent tariff lines under the landmark Ind-Aus ECTA.
 The bilateral trade agreement is estimated to increase from the present $31 billion to $45 to 50 billion in another five years.
 The trade pact will boost Gems and Jewellery sector.
 India and Australia are important strategic partners.Both the countries are part of QUAD, Trilateral  Supply Chain Initiative,IPEF Indo_Pacific Economic Forum .
 ECTA is estimated to create over a million job opportunities.

References 

Commercial treaties
International economics
Bilateral relations of India
Bilateral relations of Australia